Mary Darling is the CEO and co-owner of WestWind Pictures, which she joined in 1999. She helped WestWind evolve from a minor to a major player in Canada's film and television industry. She conceived of the hit design show, Designer Guys, and its subsequent relaunch with new hosts.

As well as providing WestWind Pictures overall management, creative and executive producer services on all of its series, Darling heads up WestWind Releasing which develops and distributes most of WestWind's diverse properties. In particular, she was the executive producer for the Canadian television comedy Little Mosque on the Prairie, which she later shopped to American broadcasters.

Darling was the recipient of the 2007 Women in Film and Television International award for International Achievement - Excellence in Innovation (Television) an award she claims to share with her husband, Clark Donnelly, even though it sits on her desk.

References

Year of birth missing (living people)
Living people
Canadian television producers
Canadian women television producers